Michèle Lamquin-Étheir (born December 12, 1946) is a Canadian lawyer and former politician, who was a member of the National Assembly of Quebec from 1997 to 2007. She was a member of the Quebec Liberal Party caucus. She is married, and the mother of three sons.

Born in Montreal, Quebec, Lamquin-Étheir was a lawyer in private practice  from 1978 to 1986, a member of the complaints examination committee of the Montreal Police Department from 1978 to 1982 and the General Manager of the Provincial Healthcare Users Committee from 1986 to 1997.

First elected to the constituency of Bourassa in a by-election in 1997, Lamquin-Étheir represented the riding until 2003, when it ceased to exist as a result of redistribution. In that year's provincial election, she was re-elected in the constituency of Crémazie, which she represented until 2007. She was defeated by Lisette Lapointe of the Parti Québécois in the 2007 election.

Electoral record (incomplete)

External links
 

1946 births
Living people
Politicians from Montreal
Quebec Liberal Party MNAs
Women MNAs in Quebec
21st-century Canadian politicians
21st-century Canadian women politicians